Jack Endacott (born 11th October 2004) is a professional footballer who plays as a midfielder for  club Plymouth Argyle.

Club career
He joined Plymouth Argyle's academy aged 10 from local club SB Frankfort. He made his professional debut on 10 August 2022, when he started in a 2–0 EFL Cup defeat to Peterborough United.

He made his league debut on 1 January 2023, appearing as a substitute in Argyle's 3–1 EFL League One win against Milton Keynes Dons that day.

Career statistics

References

External links

2004 births
English footballers
Association football midfielders
Plymouth Argyle F.C. players
English Football League players
Living people